702 Alauda , provisional designation , is a carbonaceous asteroid and binary system from the outer asteroid belt, approximately 190 kilometers in diameter. It is the parent body of the Alauda family. Discovered in 1910 by German astronomer Joseph Helffrich at Heidelberg Observatory, it was named after the lark (alauda). Its small moon, named Pichi üñëm, was discovered in 2007.

Satellite 
Pichi üñëm takes 4.91 days to complete one orbit.
It was named Pichi üñëm (Mapuche pronunciation: , approximately ), meaning "little bird" in the Mapuche language of Chile, the country from which the moon was discovered.

Orbital characteristics 
Alauda has been identified as the largest member of the Alauda family, a dynamical family of bright carbonaceous asteroids with more than a thousand known members. Other members of this family include: 581 Tauntonia, 1101 Clematis, 1838 Ursa, 3139 Shantou, 3325 TARDIS, 4368 Pillmore, 5360 Rozhdestvenskij, 5815 Shinsengumi, and many others. Alauda's moon may be a result of the collision that created the asteroid family.

Physical characteristics 
The discovery and tracking of Alauda's moon enabled Alauda's mass to be determined. The discoverers of the moon, Patricio Rojo and Jean-Luc Margot, estimated Alauda's mass to be (6.057 ± 0.36) kg and its density to be (1.57 ± 0.5) g/cm3.

Occultations 
Alauda has been observed to occult stars on several occasions, providing important information on its size and shape. It produced occultations on 2001-07-12 and 2004-04-21. It may have occulted an apparent magnitude 9.5 star in the constellation of Gemini on 2009-10-17 at 08:18 UT. This event should have been visible from Uruguay, Argentina, and Chile.

References

External links 
 Asteroids with Satellites, Robert Johnston, johnstonsarchive.net
 
 

000702
Discoveries by Joseph Helffrich
Named minor planets
000702
000702
000702
000702
19100716